Martinsville Speedway is a NASCAR-owned stock car racing short track in Ridgeway, Virginia, just south of Martinsville. At  in length, it is the shortest track in the NASCAR Cup Series. The track was also one of the first paved oval tracks in stock car racing, being built in 1947 by partners H. Clay Earles, Henry Lawrence, and Sam Rice, nearly a year before NASCAR was officially formed. It is also the only race track that has been on the NASCAR circuit from its beginning in 1948. Along with this, Martinsville is the only oval track on the NASCAR circuit to have asphalt surfaces on the straightaways and concrete to cover the turns.

Layout

The track is often referred to as paper clip-shaped and is banked only 12° in the turns.  The combination of long straightaways and flat, narrow turns makes hard braking going into turns and smooth acceleration exiting turns a must. The track was paved in 1955 and in 1956 it hosted its first 500-lap event. By the 1970s, a combination of high-traction slick tires and high speed was putting excessive wear on the asphalt surface. In 1976 the turns were repaved with concrete (a rare concept in the 1970s). By 2004, the then 28-year-old concrete had shown significant wear. On April 18, 2004 a large chunk of concrete became dislodged from the track's surface and caused severe damage to the body of Jeff Gordon's car. In reaction to this, the track was fully repaved with new concrete and asphalt.

Until 1999, Martinsville was notorious for having two pit roads.  The backstretch pit road was generally avoided because if a team had to pit there during a caution, any car pitting on the front stretch had the advantage of pitting first and not having to adhere to pace car speed upon exiting their pit road.  This was rectified when pit road was reconfigured to extend from the entrance of turn 3 to the exit of turn 2. This move allowed for a garage to be built inside the track, and leaves Bristol as the only active NASCAR track with two pit roads.

History
The first NASCAR sanctioned event was held on July 4, 1948. In 1951, only four cars were running at the finish, the fewest of any race held at the speedway. It was Gant's fourth win in a row, earning him the nickname Mr. September.

Ownership of the track was a joint venture of brothers Jim and Bill France Jr., and H. Clay Earles, the majority owner, along with daughters Dorothy Campbell and Mary Weatherford, and Dorothy Campbell's children, Sarah Fain and Clay Campbell.  In 2004, the track was sold exclusively to the France family for over $200 million as a result of an estate sale following the death of Weatherford. International Speedway Corporation (ISC) became owner of the track.

Plans had existed to add an additional 20,000 seats along the backstretch, boosting capacity to over 85,000 seats.  In 2005–2006 the Norfolk Southern Railway behind the track was moved 200 feet to make way for the added seats, but nothing more has been officially mentioned regarding this by track management since the sale of the track to ISC.

From 1982 until 1994, and again in 2006, the speedway hosted Busch Series events.  This occurred first with 200- and 150-lap features (200 laps for the two races with Whelen Modifieds, 150 laps with the September Winston/Nextel Cup race), then 300 laps from 1992 until 1994 as part of a Late Model/Busch Series doubleheader, and 250 laps in the one-off in 2006.  The venue was dropped from the Busch Series schedule for 2007 and a race at Circuit Gilles Villeneuve in Montreal was run on the open date.

Currently, Martinsville hosts two NASCAR Cup Series races — the Blue-Emu Maximum Pain Relief 500 in late March or early April and the Xfinity 500 (race nine in the NASCAR playoffs) in late October or early November — along with the NASCAR Camping World Truck Series, NASCAR Whelen Modified Tour which is held on Labor Day weekend under the lights, and late model races. NASCAR Xfinity Series also races same weekend as cup series playoff race (which is next to last race) in Xfinity series.

In 2012, Martinsville Track President Clay Campbell, Langley Speedway's owner Bill Mullis, and then South Boston Speedway's General Manager Cathy Rice formed the Virginia Triple Crown. The series contains each tracks respective crown jewel race beginning with the Thunder Road Harley-Davidson 200 held annually on Independence Day weekend at South Boston, followed by the Hampton Heat 200 held annually in late July at Langley, the series concludes in September at Martinsville with the ValleyStar Credit Union 300. The series has ran annually since 2012 except for in 2016, due to Langley Speedway's brief closure, and in 2020, due to the Covid-19 Pandemic. During the Triple Crown's eight year history there has been five different winners and only Peyton Sellers and Lee Pulliam have won it multiple times.

Winners of the NASCAR Cup Series, Truck Series, and Whelen Modified events receive a longcase clock as a trophy, a nod to Martinsville's famous furniture industry. This tradition started in 1964, when Earles decided he wanted to present a trophy that would reflect the Martinsville area. He chose clocks made by a local company, Ridgeway Clocks (now a subsidiary of Michigan-based Howard Miller). The clocks presented as trophies are currently (2009) valued at around $10,000.

After multiple late model races were forced to count caution laps in later segments in order to beat sunset, and the 2015 fall Cup race ended at sunset, the track announced on October 12, 2016, in a news conference with Campbell and Dale Earnhardt Jr., that the track would be adding a $5 million LED lighting package. Campbell also explained that Martinsville Speedway would be the first sports arena with an all-LED lighting package. Campbell said that the track did not then have plans in place for nighttime races, with its premier series dates in 2017 already locked in to start at 2 p.m. ET (in April) and 1 p.m. ET (October). But Campbell indicated that the $5 million initiative should provide flexibility in case of inclement weather. The project was completed in early February 2017 with testing of the lights in certain sections, then fully lighting the track in mid-February. It was also announced that the 300-lap NASCAR late model race will be the first NASCAR race to run in prime-time with the new lighting system in early October 2017.

Following a directive by some tracks NASCAR announced in late February to early March 2017, Martinsville was one of three races during the second half of the season (and the only one in the playoff) to experiment with a compressed two-day schedule featuring Saturday practice and Sunday afternoon qualifying, with the race starting between 90 minutes to two hours after the conclusion of knockout qualifying. The playoff race will now finish under the lights, as qualifying will move to 12:10 p.m., and after the session (which typically lasts an hour), the race will start around 3:00 p.m. (typically this would mean the race starts between 15 and 25 minutes after the hour), where with sunset being around 6:25 p.m., meaning the final laps will be run at night.  The experiment was not repeated in 2018, but the start time for the 2018 race was set for 2:30 PM, meaning the conclusion of the race will be at dusk around 6 PM.

On January 28, 2019, it was revealed on ISC's 2018 annual report that the speedway's track seating was reduced from 55,000 to 44,000.

On April 3, 2019, NASCAR announced significant changes to the Martinsville schedule including a return to the track for the NASCAR Xfinity Series in late October 2020, the spring race being moved to Mother's Day weekend under the lights, the NASCAR Whelen Modified Tour returning for the MaxPro Window Films 200 as part of the Mothers Day weekend event on a Friday night, and the NASCAR Truck Series racing only once at the track on a Friday night in late October.

The COVID-19 pandemic resulted in the 2020 Mother's Day Cup event being moved to June 10, being run on a Wednesday night. The race returned to April for 2021 and was shortened to 400 laps in 2022. A second Xfinity Series race was added beginning in 2021, while the spring Truck Series date was dropped in 2020 in favor of keeping the fall event. For 2022, the trucks returned to the spring date, with the fall date being removed from the calendar.

NASCAR Cup Series records
(As of 6/26/2022)

* from minimum 5 starts.

Records

 NASCAR Cup Series qualifying: Joey Logano, 18.898 sec (100.201 mph), March 28, 2014
 NASCAR Cup Series race lap: Ross Chastain, 18.845 sec (100.483 mph), October 30, 2022
 NASCAR Cup Series race: 
 500 laps: Jeff Gordon, 3 hr 11 min 54 sec (82.223 mph), September 22, 1996
 400 laps: William Byron, 2 hr 40 min 30 sec (79.244 mph), April 9, 2022
 NASCAR Xfinity Series qualifying: Ty Gibbs, 19.728 sec (95.985 mph), April 7, 2022
 NASCAR Xfinity Series race: 
 300 laps: Terry Labonte, 2 hr 12 min 25 sec (71.511 mph), March 20, 1994
 250 laps: Jack Ingram, 1 hr 42 min 16 sec (77.751 mph), March 25, 1984
 200 laps: Harry Gant, 1 hr 20 min 16 sec (78.637 mph), October 27, 1991
 150 laps: Sam Ard, 59 min 25 sec	(79.607 mph), September 25, 1982
 NASCAR Camping World Truck Series qualifying: Joey Logano, 19.504 sec (97.088 mph), March 28, 2015
 NASCAR Truck Series race: 
 250 laps: Rich Bickle, 1 hr 47 min 18 sec (75.296 mph), September 27, 1997
 200 laps: Johnny Sauter, 1 hr 25 min 29 sec (73.839 mph), October 29, 2016
 NASCAR Whelen Modified Tour qualifying: Ryan Preece, 18.607 sec (101.768 mph), 2021
 NASCAR Combined Modified race: Ted Christopher, 55.773 mph, 2005 (combination races only with 250-lap format)

Notes and references

External links

 
 Map and circuit history at RacingCircuits.info
 
 Martinsville Speedway Page on NASCAR.com

NASCAR tracks
Motorsport venues in Virginia
Tourist attractions in Henry County, Virginia
Martinsville, Virginia
NASCAR races at Martinsville Speedway
Buildings and structures in Henry County, Virginia
1947 establishments in Virginia
Southwest Virginia